Zinc finger, FYVE domain containing 27 is a protein that in humans is encoded by the ZFYVE27 gene.

Function 

This gene encodes a protein with several Transmembrane domains, a Rab11-binding domain and a lipid-binding FYVE finger domain. The encoded protein appears to promote Neurite formation. A mutation in this gene has been reported to be associated with Hereditary spastic paraplegia, however the Pathogenicity of the mutation, which may simply represent a Polymorphism (biology), is unclear. [provided by RefSeq, Mar 2010].

References

Further reading